Kim Hee-sun (born June 11, 1977) is a South Korean actress. She rose to fame in the 1990s with leading roles in television series such as Men of the Bath House (1995), Propose (1997), Wedding Dress (1997), Forever Yours (1998), Mister Q (1998), Sunflower (1998), and Tomato (1999). Kim also starred in the martial arts films Bichunmoo (2000) and The Myth (2005), historical media drama Faith (2012), teen drama Angry Mom (2015), mystery drama The Lady in Dignity (2017), and fantasy drama Tomorrow (2022).

Career
Kim Hee-sun won the Fair Face Beauty Contest in 1992 when she was a middle school student, and began modeling in teen magazines. In 1993, Kim, then a high school sophomore, appeared in a commercial for Lotte Samkang's crab chips, which led to her acting debut in Dinosaur Teacher; and an MC gig for music show Live TV Music 20 that same year.

She enjoyed peak popularity in the mid-to-late 1990s, starring in one hit Korean drama after another. These include Men of the Bath House (1995) written by Kim Soo-hyun, Propose (1997),  Wedding Dress (1997) with Lee Seung-yeon, Forever Yours (1998) with Ryu Si-won,  Mister Q (1998) with Kim Min-jong and Song Yun-ah, Sunflower (1998) with Ahn Jae-wook, and Tomato (1999) with Kim Suk-hoon. Kim won the top prize at the 1998 SBS Drama Awards for Mister Q, making her, at the time, the youngest ever Grand Prize (Daesang) winner, at 21 years old. During this period, she also appeared in numerous advertisements and rose to fame both at home and abroad as one of Korea's most beautiful and trend-setting actresses.

Unlike her success in television, the big screen proved to be a bigger challenge for Kim's career. She made her film debut in 1997's Repechage opposite Jang Dong-gun, and the film's director Lee Kwang-hoon subsequently put her in his next film Ghost in Love (1999). In her most high-profile role to date, Kim played the daughter of a Mongolian general in the big-budget martial arts fantasy Bichunmoo, shot in China and released in the summer of 2000. Although criticized for her acting in the film, it gave her more local and international exposure than any of her other films. Along with her popular TV dramas, it cemented her position as a Korean Wave star in mainland China, Hong Kong, Taiwan and throughout Southeast Asia.

In late 2001, Kim took on a completely different kind of role, cutting her hair short and starring as an animator in Wanee & Junah. Although her acting in this film drew a favorable response from critics, the film itself was a commercial flop. Her career took a downturn in 2003, when the environmentally-themed melodrama A Man Who Went to Mars, also known as A Letter From Mars, costarring Shin Ha-kyun became an utter bomb at the box office. She returned to television, however My Fair Lady (2003) which was adapted from the Japanese television drama Yamato Nadeshiko, and Sad Love Story (2005) where she played a blind singer, both received low ratings.

Due to her popularity among Chinese viewers, Kim was then cast opposite Jackie Chan in The Myth, for which she learned to speak Mandarin. Back in Korea, her career slump continued with Smile Again in 2006.

Kim married in 2007, and she left the entertainment scene to devote her time to being a wife and mother. During this five-year hiatus from acting, apart from appearing in magazines, Kim published a book in 2009 on childcare and how to lose post-pregnancy weight, titled Kim Hee-sun's Happy Mom Project.

Though she had a minor role in the Chinese epic The Warring States (2011), Kim officially made her comeback in 2012 as a modern-day doctor who time-travels to Goryeo in the period romance Faith, the last collaboration by screenwriter Song Ji-na and television director Kim Jong-hak.

In 2013, Kim became one of the hosts of the revamped second season of variety talk show Strong Heart, titled Hwasin – Controller of the Heart. After Hwasin was cancelled, she was cast in the Lee Kyung-hee-penned weekend family drama Wonderful Days (2014). This was followed by Angry Mom in 2015, where Kim's portrayal of the titular character who returns to high school when she learns that her teenage daughter is being bullied was highly praised by critics. Kim then began filming for Chinese fantasy television drama Ice Fantasy, which started airing in July 2016.

In 2017, Kim starred in the television series, The Lady in Dignity alongside Kim Sun-ah. The series achieved a rating of 12.6% for its finale, becoming JTBC's highest rated drama at the time. Kim's performance was well received by critics and audience.

In 2018, Kim starred in tvN's mystery drama Room No. 9. The same year she confirmed her return to the big screen with independent film Paper Flower. In 2020, Kim starred in the science fiction romance drama Alice which was broadcast on SBS in 2020 and released worldwide on Netflix in 2021.

In 2022, Kim starred in the MBC fantasy drama Tomorrow, playing the role of grim reaper Goo-ryeon.

Personal life
Kim wed businessman Park Ju-young in a lavish ceremony at the Seoul Sheraton Grande Walkerhill Hotel on October 19, 2007. She gave birth to daughter Park Yeon-ah on January 21, 2009.

Philanthropy 
On March 9, 2022, Kim donated  million to the Korean Red Cross To help the victims of the massive forest fire that started in Uljin, Gyeongbuk and has spread to Samcheok, Gangwon.  On April 25, 2022, Kim donated  million to Asan Medical Center to be used to pay for the treatments of low-income patients.

Discography

Singles

Filmography

Film

Television series

Web series

Television shows

Bibliography

Awards and nominations

State honors

Listicles

Notes

References

External links 

Kim Hee-sun on Daum 

Kim Hee-sun on Naver

1977 births
Living people
People from Daegu
South Korean television actresses
South Korean film actresses
Chung-Ang University alumni